Caelostomus chujoi is a species of ground beetle in the subfamily Pterostichinae. It was described by Jedlicka in 1961.

References

Caelostomus
Beetles described in 1961